American Cruise Lines, Inc. is a small-ship cruise line with its headquarters in Guilford, Connecticut, United States. The line operates thirteen small U.S. flagged cruise ships along the Eastern Seaboard and Western Seaboard (including Alaska) as well as the Mississippi-Ohio and Columbia-Snake river systems of the United States.

History

American Cruise Lines was incorporated in 1991.  The 49-passenger American Eagle launched in 2000 and was followed in 2002 by the same-sized American Glory. The American Spirit was launched in 2005 and held twice as many passengers. A fourth ship, American Star, was launched in 2007. In 2010 the 104 passenger American Independence, built with a wider beam and active wing stabilizers, was launched. The wider beam allows for larger staterooms, public spaces, and balconies. American Cruise Lines acquired an authentic paddlewheel cruise ship, Queen of the West, renovating it by decreasing the capacity to 120, making for a larger, more comfortable dining room, lounges, and decks.  The company has also launched two 150-passenger Mississippi River paddle-wheelers, Queen of the Mississippi in 2012 and a new American Eagle in 2015.  On 14 July 2015, ACL announced that a third Mississippi River paddle-wheeler named America will enter service in 2016.  On 4 August 2015, the company announced that Queen of the Mississippi would be renamed American Pride and repositioned to the Columbia River in early 2016, being replaced by the new America.  On October 23, 2015, ACL announced a new, coastal cruise ship.  At 170 passengers, this vessel is significantly larger than its previous 100-passenger and 104-passenger yacht style coastal ships.  This ship was named American Constellation and entered service in May 2017.  Its sister vessel was launched in 2018 and named American Constitution. On November 8, 2021 ACL announced a redesign and renaming of their paddle-wheelers. Riverboats America, Queen of the Mississippi, and Queen of the West, will become American Splendor, American Heritage and American West ("American Pride" will retain its name).

Modern riverboats
On March 1, 2017, American Cruise Lines announced a new class of five new river vessels. Unlike ACL's current riverboats, the new vessels will be of the more modern variety commonly found on European rivers rather than the Victorian-era-style paddle wheelers currently deployed. The styling is design is similar to the upcoming coastal cruise ships American Constellation and American Constitution. The vessels will feature state-of-the-art amenities like private balconies, enlarged cabins, and bathroom facilities more in line with those in hotel rooms.

In late February 2018, the company announced the beginning of the second ship's construction. The vessel is expected to enter service in 2019, while the first ship of the new class, American Song, made its inaugural cruise in October 2018.

Fleet

Coastal cruise ships
 American Spirit (2005)
 American Star (2007)
 American Independence (2010)
 American Constellation (2017)
 American Constitution (2018)

Columbia riverboats
 American West (1995)
 American Pride  (2012)

Mississippi riverboats
 American Heritage (2015)
 American Splendor (2016)

Modern riverboats
 American Song (2018)
 American Harmony (2019)
 American Jazz (2020)
 American Melody (2021)
 American Symphony (2022)

Retired
 American Eagle (2000) - indefinitely moored at Chesapeake Shipbuilding as housing for contractors.
 American Glory (2002) - scuttled off coast of Delaware on November 4, 2019 for artificial reef

References

External links

 

Cruise lines
American companies established in 1991
1991 establishments in Connecticut
Transport companies established in 1991
River cruise companies
Privately held companies based in Connecticut